Count Joseph Jérôme Siméon (30 September 1749 – 19 January 1842) was a French jurist and politician. His son, Joseph Balthasar, Comte Siméon, was a noted diplomat.

Life

Revolution
Born in Aix-en-Provence, he was the son of Joseph-Sextius Siméon (1717–1788), a professor of Law and royal secretary for the parlement of Provence. Joseph Jérôme Siméon followed his father's profession, but he was a pursued under the Reign of Terror for his share in the Girondist movement in 1793, and only returned to France after the Thermidorian Reaction.

A deputy in the Council of the Five Hundred, he sided with the conservative side. In 1799, for protesting against the 18 Fructidor invasion of the chamber by Pierre François Augereau, he was imprisoned until the Napoleon Bonaparte's 18 Brumaire coup (9 November). In the Tribunate, Siméon had an important share in the preparation of the Napoleonic code, being rewarded by a seat in the Conseil d'État of the French Consulate.

Empire and Restoration
As a figure of the First French Empire, he was one of the commissioners sent in 1807 to organize the new Kingdom of Westphalia, and was premier of King Jérôme. He served the Bourbon Restoration as councillor of state and a Peer of France. In 1820, he was under-secretary of state for Justice, and in the next year Minister of the Interior until the fall of the Armand-Emmanuel Richelieu ministry (12 December 1821).

A baron of the Empire, created count by the Restoration, he was admitted to the Academy of Political and Moral Sciences in 1832, and in 1837 he became president of the Cour des Comptes. He died in Paris aged 93. His daughter Eleonora married General Giuseppe Lechi.

References

1749 births
1842 deaths
People from Aix-en-Provence
First French Empire
19th-century French judges
Barons Siméon
Counts Siméon
People of the French Revolution
Members of the Académie des sciences morales et politiques
French interior ministers
Peers of France
State ministers of France
19th-century jurists